Tomer Devorah (Hebrew:  תומר דבורה, English: The Palm Tree of Deborah) was written in Hebrew in the middle of the 16th century by Moses Cordovero, a Jewish kabbalist in Safed, Ottoman Syria.  This short text deals mostly with the Imitation of God through the acquisition of divine traits, especially those of the sephirot.  The first edition was published in Venice in 1588.  Although not widely read among Jews today, it is popular in the mussar tradition, which focuses on the individual cultivation of the middot, or qualities of God.

The  title "Tomer Devorah" is borrowed from the original Hebrew in Book of Judges 4:5.

Online Resources
 English Translation
 Jewish Encyclopedia: Moses Cordovero
 On-Line Learning from TeachItToMe.com
 Ten Keys to Understanding Human Nature - based on Cordovero's system.  

Jewish philosophical and ethical texts
Kabbalah texts
Sephirot
Hebrew-language religious books
Sifrei Kodesh